Rani is a 1952 Indian film directed by L. V. Prasad, written by A. S. A. Sami and produced by Jupiter Pictures. The film, a Tamil-Hindi bilingual, stars P. Bhanumathi and S. Balachander. Based on the 1948 American film The Loves of Carmen, it was released on 26 April 1952.

Plot 

A princess Ranjani is tattooed with the royal insignia as part of tradition, and the same night, the child is kidnapped by one of the members of the tattoo gang who brings her up as a gypsy girl renaming her Rani. Unaware of her royal lineage, she grows up hawking things on the street and getting into brawls with no punches pulled. She falls in love with a soldier and the story progresses with twists. After several hardships, she realises the truth, and all is well that ends well.

Cast 
 P. Bhanumathi
 S. Balachander
 S. V. Subbaiah
 M. Saroja
 Wahab Kashmiri
 M. K. Mustafa
 G. M. Basheer
 M. S. S. Bhagyam
 Lakshmiprabha
 C. S. D. Singh
 M. R. Santhanam
 K. S. Angamuthu
 Baby Sachu

Production 
Rani, based on the 1948 American film The Loves of Carmen, was shot partly at Central Studios, Coimbatore, which Jupiter Pictures had taken on lease, and also at Neptune Studios, Madras. Over the course of production, there were numerous ego clashes that developed among the cast and crew. The film was simultaneously produced in Hindi. Screenwriter A. S. A. Sami was the initial director, but replaced by L. V. Prasad.

Soundtrack 
Music was composed by C. R. Subburaman assisted by D. C. Dutt who conducted the orchestra. Lyrics were penned by Ku. Sa. Krishnamoorthy, K. D. Santhanam, Udumalai Narayana Kavi and T. K. Sundara Vathiyar.

Reception 
Film historian Randor Guy wrote, "Bhanumathi excelled in the title role. Balachandar, slim and handsome, was somewhat miscast, and the romantic sequences between them raised laughs! Despite the impressive cast and pleasing music, Rani flopped in both languages".

References

External links 
 

1950s Hindi-language films
1950s multilingual films
1950s Tamil-language films
1952 films
Films directed by L. V. Prasad
Films scored by C. R. Subbaraman
Indian multilingual films
Indian remakes of American films
Jupiter Pictures films